was a House of Lords decision regarding human rights and privacy in English law.

Facts
The British model Naomi Campbell was photographed leaving a rehabilitation clinic after public denials that she was a recovering drug addict. The photographs were published in the Daily Mirror, a publication owned by MGN.

Campbell sought damages under the English law through her lawyers Schillings, which engaged Richard Spearman QC and instigated a claim for breach of confidence by engaging Article 8 of the Human Rights Act. That would require the court to comply with the European Convention on Human Rights (ECHR). The claim sought a ruling that the English tort action for breach of confidence, subject to the ECHR provisions upholding the right to private and family life, would require the court to recognise the private nature of the published information and to hold that there was a breach of her privacy.

Rather than challenge the disclosure of the fact she had been a drug addict, Campbell challenged the disclosure of information about the location of her Narcotics Anonymous meetings and the pictures that were used. The photographs, they argued, formed part of that information, would be a deterrent to her seeking further medical treatment and others would be discouraged from entering in to medical treatment at the clinic if they knew that their image might appear in the press.

Judgment

First instance
In the High Court, MGN was found liable and Campbell was awarded £2,500 in damages, plus £1,500 in aggravated damages. MGN appealed.

Court of Appeal
The court of appeal found that MGN was not liable and that the photographs could be published as they were peripheral to the published story and served only to show her in a better light. It was within journalists' margin of appreciation to decide whether such "peripheral" information should be included.

Campbell appealed on the basis of inter alia that the aforementioned breach of confidence had occurred and was subject to human rights principles of privacy.

House of Lords
The House of Lords held MGN liable by majority vote, with Lords Nicholls and Hoffmann dissenting. Baroness Hale, Lord Hope and Lord Carswell held that the picture added something of 'real significance'. The court engaged in a balancing test by firstly determining whether the applicant had a reasonable expectation of privacy (thus determining whether Article 8 was involved). It then considered whether, if the claimant was successful, that would result in a significant inference with freedom of expression (balancing Article 8 with Article 10). It was held that Campbell's right to privacy (Schedule 1, Part I, Article 8) outweighed MGN's right to freedom of expression (ECHR Article 10).

Lord Hoffmann and Lord Nicholls dissented on the grounds that as the Mirror was allowed to publish the fact that she was a drug addict and that she was receiving treatment for her addiction that printing the pictures of her leaving her NA meeting was within the margin of appreciation of the editors, as it was allowed to state that she was an addict and receiving treatment for her addiction. Lord Nicholls observed that "confidence" was an artificial term for what could more naturally be termed "privacy".

Lord Hope of Craighead noted that a duty of confidence arises wherever the defendant knows or ought to know that the claimant can reasonably expect their privacy to be protected and so approved A v B plc. If there is doubt, the test "what is highly offensive to a reasonable person" in the plaintiff's position, can be used for guidance.

Baroness Hale stated:

Aftermaths 
In English courts, MGN Limited was ordered to pay her success fee. MGN Limited appealed the order to European Court of Human Rights. ECtHR finally ruled that the recoverable success fee violated Article 10 of the European Convention on Human Rights.

See also
English tort law
Douglas v Hello! Ltd [2005] EWCA Civ 595
His Royal Highness the Prince of Wales v Associated Newspapers Ltd [2006] EWCA Civ 1776
Rantzen v Mirror Group Newspapers (1986) Ltd and others
Privacy in English law

Notes

References

External links
Bailli: Official Transcript
Campbell v MGN Ltd (Costs)
MGN Ltd v United Kingdom (39401/04)

English tort case law
English privacy case law
House of Lords cases
2004 in case law
2004 in England
Reach plc
United Kingdom privacy case law
2004 in British law
United Kingdom constitutional case law